Reinhard Häfner (2 February 1952 – 24 October 2016) was a German footballer and coach.

Häfner played children's and youth football for his hometown club BSG Motor Sonneberg. As a junior player he was assigned to FC Rot-Weiss Erfurt before joining Dynamo Dresden in 1971. He stayed with the Dresden club until his retirement as a player in 1988 having played in 366 East German first division DDR-Oberliga matches, scoring 49 goals. He is second to Hans-Jürgen Dörner in matches played for Dynamo. Häfner was part of four DDR championship and FDGB Pokal (East German Cup) winning teams there.

Between 1971 and 1984 he was capped 58 times for the East Germany national football team, scoring 5 goals, and was part of the gold medal-winning squad at the 1976 Summer Olympics in Montreal, Canada.

In April 1990, two years after his retirement as a player, Häfner became head coach of Dynamo Dresden, replacing Eduard Geyer. Weeks later Dynamo claimed its eighth championship and seventh cup. The following season, despite the sale of star players Ulf Kirsten and Matthias Sammer, Häfner guided the Dresden team to a second-place finish in the final DDR-Oberliga season before the merger of the football competitions of East and West Germany following the reunification of the country, qualifying the club for the first division Bundesliga. Despite this success he was dismissed in June 1991. He moved on to coach second division club Chemnitzer FC from 1993 to 1996.

Häfner joined SV Grün-Weiß Langeneichstädt (Kreisliga Merseburg/Querfurt, Sachsen-Anhalt) in the post-season of 2006–07.

References

External links
 Veterans

1952 births
2016 deaths
People from Sonneberg
German footballers
East German footballers
FC Rot-Weiß Erfurt players
Dynamo Dresden players
Dynamo Dresden managers
Footballers at the 1972 Summer Olympics
Footballers at the 1976 Summer Olympics
Olympic footballers of East Germany
Olympic bronze medalists for East Germany
Olympic gold medalists for East Germany
East Germany international footballers
Dynamo Dresden non-playing staff
Olympic medalists in football
Chemnitzer FC managers
DDR-Oberliga players
Medalists at the 1976 Summer Olympics
Medalists at the 1972 Summer Olympics
Association football midfielders
Footballers from Thuringia
German football managers